Álvaro Ruvira Yáñez (born 23 March 2000) is a Spanish footballer who plays as a goalkeeper.

Club career
Born in Pinoso, Valencian Community, Ruvira joined Hércules CF's youth setup in 2010, aged ten, from hometown side Pinoso CF.

Ruvira made his senior debut with the reserves on 9 September 2017, starting in a 3–2 Regional Preferente home win against Benferri CF. The following July, after four appearances, he signed for Getafe CF and returned to the youth setup.

Ahead of the 2019–20 season, Ruvira moved to CF Fuenlabrada and was assigned to the B-side in the regional leagues. He made his first-team debut on 8 August 2020, starting in a 1–2 away loss at Deportivo de La Coruña in the Segunda División, as several first-team players were out due to a COVID-19 outbreak in the squad.

References

External links

2000 births
Living people
People from Vinalopó Mitjà
Sportspeople from the Province of Alicante
Spanish footballers
Footballers from the Valencian Community
Association football goalkeepers
Segunda División players
Divisiones Regionales de Fútbol players
Hércules CF B players
CF Fuenlabrada B players
CF Fuenlabrada footballers